Carey-Ann Burnham is a clinical microbiologist, and a professor of Pathology and Immunology, Molecular Microbiology, Pediatrics and Medicine in Washington University School of Medicine in St. Louis. She is an elected fellow of the American Academy of Microbiology.

Education 
Burnham earned her Ph.D. in Medical Sciences at the University of Alberta in 2007. Later, she pursued fellowship training in clinical microbiology at Washington University, which she completed in 2009.

Career
Burnham is a professor of Pathology and Immunology, Molecular Microbiology, Pediatrics and Medicine at Washington University. She is the medical director for the clinical microbiology laboratory at Barnes-Jewish Hospital and the program director for the CPEP fellowship at Washington University.

Research 
Burnham's research is focused on rapid pathogen identification and antibiotic susceptibility testing to prevent infectious diseases. Burnham edited the Journal of Clinical Microbiology, the Clinical Microbiology Newsletter, Clinics in Laboratory Medicine, and the Manual of Clinical Microbiology. She is the co-editor of the textbook The Dark Art of Blood Cultures, which received praise in the Journal of Clinical Microbiology, where Stephen M. Brecher called the work, "a wonderful historical perspective of the past, present, and future of blood cultures." She has had her work on the topic of diagnostic and clinical microbiology published over two hundred times.

Memberships 
Burnham has held senior positions and leadership roles in several professional organizations, including the American Society for Microbiology, Clinical and Laboratory Standards Institute, the American Academy of Microbiology, and the Academy of Clinical Laboratory Physicians and Scientists.

Awards and honors 
2018 Elected fellow of the American Academy of Microbiology
2020 American Society for Microbiology Award for Research and Leadership in Clinical Microbiology
Academy of Clinical Laboratory Physicians and Scientists Ellis S. Benson Award
"40 Under 40" honoree by the American Society for Clinical Pathology

Selected publications

References 

Year of birth missing (living people)
Living people
American women biologists
American microbiologists
Washington University in St. Louis faculty
University of Alberta alumni